Chavdarov, female form Chavdarova, is a Bulgarian surname. Notable people with this surname include:

 Iliyan Chavdarov (born 1991), Bulgarian football player
 Nikolay Chavdarov (born 1976), Bulgarian football player
 Rumyana Chavdarova (born 1950), Bulgarian middle-distance runner
 Zdravko Chavdarov (born 1981), Bulgarian football player